Vergelle is a village in Tuscany, central Italy, in the comune of Montalcino, province of Siena.

Bibliography 
 

Frazioni of Montalcino